"Put It Straight" (Hangul: 싫다고 말해), also known as "Tell Me You Don't Like It", is a song recorded by South Korean girl group (G)I-dle, for their second extended play, I Made (2019), which was released on February 26, 2019 by Cube Entertainment. As the third track on the album, it was written by Soyeon, and was produced by Soyeon and FCM Houdini. The original song was described as "a sad ballad song". 

"Put It Straight (Nightmare Version)" (싫다고 말해 (Nightmare Version)), is an alternative version of the song for survival show, Queendom. The song was released by Stone Music Entertainment and distributed by Genie Music on October 18, 2019. It is a re-arranged ballad song to a horror version, that expresses the feelings of anger and obsession.

Background
On the 9th episode of Queendom, the group prepared for the second round of 'Pandora's Box'. The theme of the contest was 'Pandora's Box,' and the participants had to perform on stage with the songs they chose. In selecting the songs, Soyeon chose "Put It Straight". Yuqi wanted a more popular song, saying, "It's not just our fans watching." Other members also said, "Because it's a Pandora's box, it would be better to use music the fans wants." but with Soyeon's persuasion, "Because it's a ballad that doesn't have a sense of beat, it would be really cool to arrange it in a dance song," and "I think I should do it while striking a bruise at first, and then giving strength to my eyes." Yuqi commented, "I'm in love. Listening to it, I think it's so good!". The group decided to re-arrange "Put It Straight" with a grotesque feeling.

Live performances

The group performed the song on episode 9 of Queendom Fan-dora's Box. The musical performance started off with the sound of the rain, with dreamy but bizarre and horror atmosphere, and the glitch sound effect that gives the audience a dramatic atmosphere feeling. The group attracted the viewer's attention on the contrast of red dresses danced with bare feet, and smudged red lipstick with their hands to give a bleeding effect.

After the stage, they received praises form viewers and contestants. Jimin from AOA was surprised by saying, "It feels like watching a music video," and Lovelyz clapped and admired, "You're so good." Oh My Girl's YooA said, "It was a stage to imprint." The performance was called "another legend stage was born, with the perfect performance expressing anger in sadness and the detailed emotional acting of the members". A video of the performance was released through Mnet's official Youtube account the same day. It surpassed one million views after 14 hours of release. The group placed fourth in the round. It was later revealed that (G)I-dle partnered up with Touch in Sol for their LaLa Bla's lipstick. 

On October 29, 2019, (G)I-dle released a choreographed video of "Put It Straight" (Halloween version) as a gift for their fans.

Credits and personnel

Nightmare version
Credits are adapted from Melon.
 (G)I-dle – vocals
  Soyeon – producing, songwriting, rap arrangement, audio engineer, chorus
 June – audio engineer, synthesizer
 FCM Houdini – guitar
 Shin Jae-bin  – recording, mixing
 Jeon Jeon  – recording
 Kwon Nam-woo  – mastering engineer

Track listing
I Made

Queendom Fan-dora's Box Part 1
 "Put It Straight (Nightmare Version)"  – 4:16

Charts

Release history

References 

(G)I-dle songs
2019 singles
2019 songs
Cube Entertainment singles
Korean-language songs
Songs written by Jeon So-yeon